Tash (also Romanized as Ţash and Tesh) is a village in Pir Bazar Rural District, in the Central District of Rasht County, Gilan Province, Iran. At the 2006 census, its population was 964, in 251 families.

References 

Populated places in Rasht County